Nanaji is a given name. Notable people with the name include:

Nanaji Deshmukh (1916–2010), Indian activist
Nanaji Sitaram Shamkule, Indian politician

See also
Nanji

Masculine given names